Al Shindagha Tunnel (Arabic: نفق الشندغة) is a tunnel in Dubai, United Arab Emirates. Opened on 19 December 1975, it is the oldest and the busiest tunnel where 55,000 vehicles travel through the tunnel both directions daily. It goes under Dubai Creek to connect the neighborhoods of Al Ras, Deira and Al Shindagha where it is the only underwater road crossing Dubai Creek.

History
For many years the twin town of Deira and Al Ras were connected by a twin bridge which caused delays due to time lags in opening and closing of the vacuoles. Sheikh Rashid bin Saeed Al Maktoum, Dubai ruler entrusted Sir William Halcrow and Partners to do a feasibility study to build a more direct link between the two towns. A bridge nearer to the sea was not possible, the reason being the same when the existing bridge were sited and William Halcrow and partners proposed a tunnel to be built. An added advantage of the tunnel would be its proximity to the Port Rashid which was also designed by William Halcrow and partners. Preliminary studies demonstrated the feasibility of both dry land and immersed methods of construction. The contractor company however elected to build the tunnel in the dry. Stage 1 envisages dredging back of Deira bank to form a new diverted channel for shipping and building of a coffer dam out in to the creek from the Shindaga. Stage 2 would be to create an island in the middle of the creek and reopen the original channel for shipping now between the island and the Shindaga, Close the new diverted channel. Then building a new coffer dam in the Deira bank and pump the area dry and start building the tunnel from the Deira side towards the island. Finally on completion the original bank and channel would be reinstated.

It was inaugurated on 19 December 1975 by Khalifa bin Hamad Al Thani, the ruler of Qatar, in the presence of Zayed bin Sultan Al Nahyan, the president of the United Arab Emirates and Rashid bin Saeed Al Maktoum, the vice president of UAE and the ruler of Dubai.

Replacement
Due to the aging of the tunnel, the Roads and Transport Authority is planning to replace tunnel with a bridge. The bridge is set to have multiple lanes to improve the flow of traffic.

External links
Construction video of the tunnel

References

Tunnels in the United Arab Emirates
Transport in Dubai
Buildings and structures in Dubai
Tunnels completed in 1975
Road tunnels